Hunter Bryant (born August 20, 1998) is an American football tight end of the National Football League (NFL) who is a free agent. He played college football at Washington.

Early years
Bryant attended Eastside Catholic School in Sammamish, Washington. During his high school career he caught 138 passes for 2,483 yards and 35 touchdowns. He committed to the University of Washington to play college football.

College career
As a true freshman at Washington, Bryant played in nine games with five starts. He finished the season with 22 receptions for 331 yards and a touchdown. As a sophomore in 2018, he played in only five games because of injury. He recorded 11 receptions for 238 yards and one touchdown. Bryant returned from the injury in 2019.  Following the 2019 where he was named to the first-team All-Pac-12, Bryant announced that he would forgo his senior season and declared for the 2020 NFL Draft.

Professional career
After going undrafted in the 2020 NFL Draft, Bryant was signed by the Detroit Lions. Despite a hamstring injury limiting him in training camp, Bryant made the Lions 53-man roster. After recovering from the injury, he then suffered a concussion in practice and was placed on injured reserve on October 16, 2020. He was activated on December 2, 2020.

Bryant was waived by the Lions on April 28, 2021, with a failed physical designation, and reverted to the team's non-football injury list the next day.

Bryant was waived by the Lions on April 27, 2022.

References

External links
Washington Huskies bio

1998 births
Living people
People from Issaquah, Washington
Players of American football from Washington (state)
Sportspeople from King County, Washington
American football tight ends
Washington Huskies football players
Detroit Lions players